Ilford is an Indian settlement in northern Manitoba, Canada. The Mooseocoot Indian reserve is located within the community boundary and is populated by the War Lake First Nation.

Demographics 

Services 
The community provides the following services:
 fire protection by a volunteer fire department with pumper truck,
 Royal Canadian Mounted Police (RCMP)
 Community Health Worker
 Ilford Airport
 Via Rail serve passengers at the Ilford railway station.
 Power provided by Manitoba Hydro
 Telephone service provided by Manitoba Telecom Services
 Chlorinated and filtered water service (sourced from Moose Nose Lake)
 Sewage treatment plant (installed in 1994)
 Julie Lindal School (including Gymnasium)
 Multi-purpose building
 Skating rink
 Gold Trail Hotel

References

External links 
 Map of Ilford at Statcan

Indian settlements in Manitoba
Populated places in Northern Region, Manitoba